Anthony Mark Bucco (born April 12, 1962) is an American Republican Party politician currently serving as the State Senator for New Jersey's 25th Legislative District. Bucco is an attorney who currently serves on the Morris County Republican Committee as its general counsel. He was previously a member of the New Jersey General Assembly, and was appointed to the State Senate in 2019 following the death of his father, incumbent Senator Anthony R. Bucco.

Bucco serves in the Senate as the Republican Whip.

New Jersey Assembly
After Assemblyman Rick Merkt announced that he would run for the Republican nomination for Governor of New Jersey rather than seek re-election in 2009, Bucco announced that he would run for Merkt's seat, which was previously held by his father, Anthony R. Bucco, from 1995 to 1999. Morris County Freeholder Douglas Cabana, the brother of Bucco's wife Amy, also announced his candidacy. Cabana's campaign emphasized his many years in elective office as a Boonton Township Councilman, Boonton Township Mayor, and Freeholder, contrasting this with Bucco's lack of experience in elective office. Bucco countered by accusing Cabana of running a negative campaign, pointing to a Cabana mailer containing "unpleasant photos" of Bucco and "some misinformation." Bucco defeated Cabana by less than 800 votes in the Republican primary. He and running mate Michael Patrick Carroll, a veteran assemblyman, won the general election easily in the heavily Republican 25th district. The two would be reelected in 2011, 2013, 2015, and 2017.

New Jersey Senate
After his father's death on September 16, 2019, Bucco announced his candidacy for the State Senate vacancy while maintaining his campaign for reelection to the Assembly. Bucco won the appointment to the Senate in a special convention of 25th district Republican committeemembers held on October 15, 2019 and subsequently won the Assembly seat for which he was running in the November general election. Bucco will decline being seated in the Assembly upon the start of the new term in 2020 and the district's Republican committee appointed a new Assemblyperson.

Committee assignments 
Committee assignments for the 2022—23 session are:
Judiciary
Labor

25th District 

Each of the 40 districts in the New Jersey Legislature has one representative in the New Jersey Senate and two members in the New Jersey General Assembly. The representatives from the 25th District for the 2022—23 Legislative Session are:
Senator Anthony M. Bucco (R)
Assemblyman Brian Bergen (R)
Assemblywoman Aura K. Dunn (R)

Personal life
A lifelong resident of the Boonton, New Jersey area, Bucco attended Boonton High School. Bucco attended Lycoming College and earned a bachelor's degree in business administration and managerial economics. He then graduated from Seton Hall University School of Law and was admitted to the bar. Bucco has spent over twenty years as a municipal attorney in private practice, specializing in local government law. He is currently a partner in the law firm of Murphy and McKeon, P.C. He has been involved in state issues such as the Highlands Act and affordable housing laws by representing municipalities on those issues in court. Bucco has served as a volunteer firefighter with the Boonton Fire Department for 28 years, attaining the rank of captain. Bucco has been involved in fighting alcohol and drug abuse, having served on the Governor's Council on Alcoholism and Drug Abuse since 1998, and helped found Daytop New Jersey, a drug and alcohol rehabilitation center for teenagers, later serving on the organization's board of directors. He is also one of 22 commissioners of the Morris County Sheriff's CrimeStoppers program, and has served in that capacity since 1999.

Electoral history

New Jersey Assembly

References

External links

Senator Anthony M. Bucco's legislative web page, New Jersey Legislature
New Jersey Legislature financial disclosure forms
2016 2015 2014 2013 2012 2011 2010 2009

1962 births
Living people
Boonton High School alumni
Lycoming College alumni
New Jersey lawyers
Seton Hall University School of Law alumni
Democratic Party members of the New Jersey General Assembly
Democratic Party New Jersey state senators
People from Boonton Township, New Jersey
21st-century American politicians